Auka may refer to:

 Auka (company), a Norwegian financial technology firm
 Waorani language, commonly known as Sabela, also pejoratively as Auka or Auca
 Auka, a character in The Wheel on the School
 Auka, a dialect of the Nakanai language

See also
Auke (disambiguation)